The Ven  Arthur William Upcott , DD, MA (6 January 1857 – 22 May 1922) was an Anglican priest and educationalist.

He was born in Cullompton on 6 January 1857   and educated at Sherborne and Exeter College, Oxford. Ordained in 1886, he was Chaplain then Head Master of  St Mark's School, Windsor until 1891. He held two further headships: St Edmund's School, Canterbury (1891–1902); and Christ's Hospital ( 1902–1919).

He was Rector of Brightling and Archdeacon of Hastings from 1920 until his death  on 22 May 1922.

Notes

1857 births
People from Cullompton
People educated at Sherborne School
Alumni of Exeter College, Oxford
Archdeacons of Hastings
1922 deaths
People from Brightling